Sergey Khandozhko (born May 19, 1992) is a retired Russian male mixed martial artist who competed in the Welterweight division of the Ultimate Fighting Championship.

Background
While in the first grade, his parents signed Sergey to the sambo/judo. In the military camp, he got jaundice, passed the full course of treatment in the local hospital, upon arrival in his native town, he was recovering for half a year, with his motor activity being kept to a minimum and having a strict diet. Then he began practicing karate at the age of 15, which was supposed to be a very late age for this kind of martial arts, but a year later he was Champion of Moscow and Russia in Ashihara Karate. Then his family moved to Odintsovo, where his father, being a military man, got an apartment. Hee joined the martial arts because he couldn't find a karate coach.

By the adolescence keenness for sports went down.  Having recovered, he went to the hand-to-hand fighting section at the age of 14-15, where he took karate, his trainer - Alexander Ivanovich Zhokin. Since the age of 16 Khandozhko became more than one champion of Moscow and Russia in his weight, but did not have a corresponding belt.

In October 2010 became a winner at the World Championship in all-round combat. In 2011 took the 1st place at the IX Open Championship of the Kryukovo Municipality in the hand-to-hand fighting (punkration version) in the category up to 80 kg., 2nd place in the category up to 80 kg at the Cup in the hand-to-hand fighting, 2nd place at the Championship of Russia in the universal fighting in the category up to 80 kg., 1st place in the championship in hand-to-hand fighting "Russian Bogatyr". In June - the winner of amateur championship on MMA in the category up to 85 kg. July - 1st place in the category up to 80 kg. on the European Championship on Universal Fighting; October - 1st place on the World Championship on Universal Fighting. During the same period became bronze medalist of the Moscow Open MMA Championship among men over 18 in the category up to 80 kg.

Since 2018, he has been acting director of the State Budgetary Institution of the KK of the sports school "Regional Martial Arts Center".

Mixed martial arts career

Early career
Making his professional MMA debut in 2011 against Dmitry Lapatin, winning by technical knockout in the first round. Studying at the university of the system of the Ministry of Internal Affairs of Russia and not having enough time for full-fledged training, they studied with a classmate V. Myasnikov in the kitchen of the hostel. He suffered his first defeat from Eduard Vardanyan in May 2013 at the Legend tournament, where Alexander Emelianenko and Bob Sapp met in the main battle.

Khandozhko compiled a 25–5–1 record fighting on the Russian regional scene, fighting most notably with Absolute Championship Berkut, where he faced the likes of future ACA Welterweight champ and fellow UFC fighter Albert Duraev, losing by the way of unanimous decision, but also the likes of Ben Alloway, who he lost to via rear-naked choke in the third round.

In the bout right before signing with the UFC, Khandozhko faced Adriano Rodrigues at S-70: Plotforma Cup 2018, where he won the bout via body kick KO in the second round.

Ultimate Fighting Championship
Khandozhko was expected to make his UFC debut against Bartosz Fabiński on June 1, 2019 at UFC Fight Night: Gustafsson vs. Smith, but Fabiński pulled out due to injury and was replaced by Rostem Akman. Sergey won the bout via unanimous decision.

Khandozhko's next fight was scheduled for UFC Fight Night: Cowboy vs. Gaethje on September 14, 2019 against Michel Pereira. Sergey would face visa issues and was replaced by the Canadian Tristan Connelly

Khandozhko faced Rustam Khabilov on 9 November 2019 at UFC Fight Night: Magomedsharipov vs. Kattar. He lost the fight via unanimous decision.

Khandozhko was scheduled to face Nicolas Dalby on 26 June 2021 at UFC Fight Night: Gane vs. Volkov. However, Khandozhko pulled out due to knee injury and was replaced by Tim Means.

Khandozhko was scheduled to face David Zawada on September 4, 2021 at UFC Fight Night: Brunson vs. Till.  However, the week before the event, Khandozhko was pulled from the contest for unknown reasons and replaced by Alex Morono.

After over two years away from the sport, Khandozhko returned face Dwight Grant on April 23, 2022, at UFC Fight Night: Lemos vs. Andrade. He won the fight via technical knockout in the second round.  This fight earned him the Fight of the Night award.

On November 1, 2022, Khandozhko announced his retirement from MMA to focus on coaching youth.

Championships and accomplishments
Ultimate Fighting Championship
Fight of the Night (One time)

Mixed martial arts record

|-
|Win
|align=center|27–6–1
|Dwight Grant
|TKO (punches)
|UFC Fight Night: Lemos vs. Andrade
|
|align=center|2
|align=center|4:15
|Las Vegas, Nevada, United States
||
|-
|Loss
|align=center|26–6–1
|Rustam Khabilov
|Decision (unanimous)
|UFC Fight Night: Magomedsharipov vs. Kattar
|
|align=center|3
|align=center|5:00
|Moscow, Russia
|
|-
|Win
|align=center|26–5–1
|Rostem Akman
|Decision (unanimous)
|UFC Fight Night: Gustafsson vs. Smith
|
|align=center|3
|align=center|5:00
|Stockholm, Sweden
|
|-
|Win
|align=center|25–5–1
|Adriano Rodrigues
|KO (kick to the body)
|S-70: Plotforma Cup 2018
|
|align=center|2
|align=center|3:19
|Sochi, Russia
|
|-
|Win
|align=center|24–5–1
|Miller Couto
|Submission (rear-naked choke)
|Golden Team Championship 4
|
|align=center|2
|align=center|4:59
|Mytishchi, Russia
|
|-
|Loss
|align=center|23–5–1
|Stanislav Vlasenko
|Submission (triangle choke)
|ACB 68
|
|align=center|3
|align=center|3:34
|Dushanbe, Tajikistan
|
|-
|Win
|align=center|23–4–1
|Stanislav Vlasenko
|Decision (split)
|ACB 55
|
|align=center|3
|align=center|5:00
|Dushanbe, Tajikistan
|
|-
|Loss
|align=center|22–4–1
|Benny Alloway
|Submission (rear-naked choke)
|ACB 48
|
|align=center|3
|align=center|3:09
|Moscow, Russia
|
|-
|Win
|align=center|22–3–1
|Mauricio Machado
|KO (head kick)
|ACB 38
|
|align=center|1
|align=center|0:05
|Rostov-on-Don, Russia
|
|-
|Loss
|align=center|21–3–1
|Patrik Kincl
|Decision (unanimous)
|ACB 32
|
|align=center|3
|align=center|5:00
|Moscow, Russia
|
|-
|Win
|align=center|21–2–1
|Guillermo Martinez Ayme
|Decision (unanimous)
|ACB 26
|
|align=center|3
|align=center|5:00
|Grozny, Russia
|
|-
|Loss
|align=center|20–2–1
|Albert Duraev
|Decision (unanimous)
|ACB 20
|
|align=center|3
|align=center|5:00
|Sochi, Russia
|
|-
|Win
|align=center|20–1–1
|Sergey Faley
|TKO (punches)
|ACB 16
|
|align=center|1
|align=center|3:20
|Moscow, Russia
|
|-
|Win
|align=center|19–1–1
|Vasily Fedorych
|TKO (punches)
|Fight Star: Battle on Sura 3
|
|align=center|2
|align=center|N/A
|Penza, Russia
|
|-
|Win
|align=center|18–1–1
|Anton Radman
|Decision (unanimous)
|White Rex: Warriors Spirit 33
|
|align=center|3
|align=center|5:00
|Saint Petersburg, Russia
|
|-
|Win
|align=center|17–1–1
|Marco Santi
|Decision (unanimous)
|White Rex: Warrior Spirit 27
|
|align=center|3
|align=center|5:00
|Moscow, Russia
|
|-
|Win
|align=center|16–1–1
|Felipe Nsue
|Submission (armbar)
|Tyumen Fight
|
|align=center|2
|align=center|4:59
|Tyumen, Russia
|
|-
|Win
|align=center|15–1–1
|Alexey Poda
|TKO (punches)
|Oplot MMA: White Collars 28
|
|align=center|1
|align=center|1:42
|Kharkiv, Ukraine
|
|-
|Win
|align=center|14–1–1
|Marvin Ademaj
|Decision (unanimous)
|White Rex: The Birth of a Nation
|
|align=center|3
|align=center|5:00
|Moscow, Russia
|
|-
|Loss
|align=center|13–1–1
|Eduard Vartanyan
|TKO (punches)
|Legend: Emelianenko vs. Sapp
|
|align=center|2
|align=center|4:00
|Moscow, Russia
|
|-
|Win
|align=center|13–0–1
|Simone Tessari
|Submission (rear-naked choke)
|Overtime Cup 2013
|
|align=center|1
|align=center|2:11
|Moscow, Russia
|
|-
|Win
|align=center|12–0–1
|Martin Seferbekov
|Decision (unanimous)
|Fight Riot 1
|
|align=center|3
|align=center|5:00
|Voronezh, Russia
|
|-
|Win
|align=center|11–0–1
|Ilya Martisyuk
|Submission (rear-naked choke)
|M-1 Global: M-1 Fighter 2012 Grand Finale
|
|align=center|1
|align=center|3:02
|Moscow, Russia
|
|-
|Win
|align=center|10–0–1
|Wiktor Sobczyk
|KO (punch)
|ProFC 42: Oplot Challenge
|
|align=center|1
|align=center|0:29
|Kharkiv, Ukraine
|
|-
|Draw
|align=center|9–0–1
|Anton Kotyukov
|Draw (split)
|Lion's Fights 2
|
|align=center|2
|align=center|5:00
|Kolpino, Russia
|
|-
|Win
|align=center|9–0
|Vitaly Lazovskiy
|KO (knees and punches)
|R.O.D: Shield And Sword 2
|
|align=center|1
|align=center|3:25
|Moscow, Russia
|
|-
|Win
|align=center|8–0
|Marat Bekmuratov
|TKO (punches)
|Cracked Ice Cup 2012
|
|align=center|1
|align=center|0:39
|Moscow, Russia
|
|-
|Win
|align=center|7–0
|Viktor Shishunin
|TKO (knee to the body)
|R.O.D.: Spear Of Peresvet 2012
|
|align=center|1
|align=center|3:20
|Sergiyev Posad, Russia
|
|-
|Win
|align=center|6–0
|Magomedsalam Kaynurov
|Decision (unanimous)
|Voronezh Interregional 2012
|
|align=center|2
|align=center|5:00
|Voronezh, Russia
|
|-
|Win
|align=center|5–0
|Babyrbek Samiev
|Submission (triangle choke)
|Chekhov Fight Night 2011
|
|align=center|1
|align=center|1:40
|Chekhov, Russia
|
|-
|Win
|align=center|4–0
|Marat Bekmuratov
|Submission (guillotine choke)
|WPFL: Panfight Championship 4
|
|align=center|1
|align=center|2:24
|Moscow, Russia
|
|-
|Win
|align=center|3–0
|Andrey Markovich
|Submission (triangle choke)
|Freestyle Fight 2
|
|align=center|1
|align=center|4:20
|Moscow, Russia
|
|-
|Win
|align=center|2–0
|Magomedsalam Kaynurov
|KO (punches)
|Radmer Cup 1
|
|align=center|1
|align=center|4:10
|Sterlitamak, Russia
|
|-
|Win
|align=center|1–0
|Dmitriy Lapatin
|TKO (punches)
|WPFL: Panfight Championship 1
|
|align=center|1
|align=center|3:15
|Moscow, Russia
|

See also 
 List of male mixed martial artists

References

External links 
  
 

1992 births
Living people
Russian male mixed martial artists
Welterweight mixed martial artists
Mixed martial artists utilizing Ashihara kaikan
Ultimate Fighting Championship male fighters
Russian male karateka
People from Torzhok
Sportspeople from Tver Oblast